Statistics of UAE Football League for the 1999–2000 season.

Overview
It was contested by 12 teams, and Al Ain FC won the championship.

League standings

References
United Arab Emirates - List of final tables (RSSSF)

UAE Pro League seasons
United
1999–2000 in Emirati football